List of some of the most important awards won by Spanish artist Raphael.

Awards, citations and honors
 Nominated – Commendator of the Order of Isabel the Catholic
(granted by H.R.H. King Juan Carlos I of Spain). (1987)
 Named Most Illustrious Lord of the Order of Cisneros (Raphael is therefore a marquess within Spanish nobility)
 Inducted into the International Latin Music Hall of Fame in 2003.
 Living Legend Award at the 5th Annual La Musa Awards (2018).
 Gold Medal of the Community of Madrid. (2019)
Lo Nuestro Excellence Award (2020)
Billboard Latin Music Lifetime Achievement Award (2022)
 2 Quijote de Oro Award from TVE (Televisión Española) (1975)
 Honor to four decades of success in the world (Spain, 2006)
 "Honor Award from the Music Academy" to four decades of success in the world (Spain, 2006).
 "Golden Medal" from the "Círculo de Bellas Artes" (Spain, 2006).
 "Golden Medal of Andalusia" (Spain, 2007).
 Named "Most Illustrious Lord of the Order of Cisneros" (Raphael is therefore a marquess within Spanish nobility)
 Elected 4 times as "Popular" (artist) by the readers of Diario Pueblo, (Madrid).
 3 times chosen "Super Popular" by readers, Diario Pueblo, (Madrid).
 4 "Aplauso" awards.
 7 "Olé of the Song" Awards, (Barcelona).
 3 "Heraldos de Mexico" (Highest award given to singers in Mexico).
 "Rafael Guinad" Award (Venezuela).
 "Hoja de Plata" Award (Madrid).
 2 "Quijote de Oro" Awards from Spanish television.
 "Golden Medal" from the "Círculo de Escritores" of Madrid.
 6 times "Champion Best-sellers of Discs".
 4 "ACE" Awards to the "Best concert of the year", given by the "Asociación de Críticos de Espectáculos" (New York).
 2 "El Sol Azteca" Awards (México).
 "Golden Disc to the Best Singer" in Middem (Cannes, Francia).
 4 "Guaicaipuro de Oro" Awards (Venezuela).
 Award to the "Best Pop Singer in Spanish".
 Award from "Sindicato Nacional del Espectáculo".
 "Golden Medal and Diamonds" from "Departamento de Turismo" (México).
 5 "Silver Torches", 2 "Golden Torches" and 1 "Silver Gull" at "Viña del Mar Festival of Song and Music" (Chile).
 Named as "Favorite Son" of: México, Colombia, Ecuador, Chile, Argentina, Venezuela and Perú.
 Awarded the "Key to the City" in New York City, Los Angeles, Chicago and Miami (5 times).
 Named "Español Universal" by the "Cámara de Comercio Española" in Miami.
 Named "Andaluz Universal" by "Andalucía en el Mundo" Magazine .
 "Gold Medal to the Merit in the Work "(Spain).
 Star with his name in "Hall of Fame Avenue" (Los Angeles).
 'Golden Star' Award granted by the "Club of Means" in recognition to his long and consolidated professional trajectory.
 "Shangay" Special Award.
 “Hipódromo de la Américas" Award to his international artistic trajectory (México).
 "Jiennense 2004" Award.
 "Linarense 2004" Award.
 "Júbilo 2005" Award.
 "Luna del Auditorio" to the Best Crooner Concert 2006 (México).
 "Plate of bronze" in "Paseo de las Lunas" (México, 2006).
 The first color television broadcast in Puerto Rico, aired in 1969, was a live concert by Raphael.´
 2 Streets in Spain were given his name, one in Linares -his natal city- (Jaén) and the other in Estepona (Málaga).

Grammy Awards
Best Mexican/Mexican-American Performance: Eternamente Tuyo - 1985 (Nominated)
Best Latin Pop Performance: Las Apariencias Engañan - 1989 (Nominated) 
Best Latin Pop Album: Ave Fénix (Nominated) - 1993

Friend of the Musical Spanish Industry Award
 Honor to his artistic career (1999)

References

Raphael